Hilary King  (born 1931) is a Welsh bowler and, as first woman President of the World Indoor Bowls Council (2001) and the first woman to be given Honorary Life Membership of the World Indoor Bowls Council, a pioneer for women in the sport.

Early life

Born Hilary Pomeroy and raised in Treherbert, the daughter of local shopkeepers, King took up outdoor bowls in the mid 1960s.

Career

Although an accomplished bowler in her own right, King's main contribution to the sport has been as an administrator. Starting as Secretary of Treherbert Ladies Outdoor Club (1976–94), she became Secretary of Glamorgan County Bowls Association (1980–85) and soon became Secretary of Rhondda Indoor Bowls (1982–84) while simultaneously National Tournament Secretary (1982–85). In 1985 she became Secretary of the Welsh Ladies Indoor Bowling Association, a post she still holds. She was in addition, the Secretary of British Isles Women’s Indoor Bowls Council (2000–03).

Keen to promote the sustainability of the sport, in the 2000s King set up and organised the annual Welsh Ladies Junior Singles and the World Junior Singles Tournament (named the Wilf Pomeroy Trophy after Hilary's father, the mixed Under 16 Club Leagues and, determined also to promote the benefits of sport for older people, she initiated the Welsh over 60’s Mixed Pairs Tournament. Aware of the power of the media, due to her efforts the Ladies National Bowls Singles event has been televised since 2003, which means that the sport can reach a wider audience and its popularity has been increased even further.

In the 2008 Birthday Honours, King was awarded an MBE in recognition for her services to Bowls in Wales.

External links
Welsh Ladies Indoor Bowls Association website:

References

Welsh female bowls players
Members of the Order of the British Empire
1931 births
Living people
People from Treherbert
Sportspeople from Rhondda Cynon Taf
Welsh sports executives and administrators